The 2012 winter transfer window for Indian football transfers opened on 1 January and will close on 31 January. Additionally, players without a club may join at any time, and clubs may sign a goalkeeper on an emergency loan if they have no registered goalkeeper available.

Transfers

References

Transfers
India
2012